Maple is a symbolic and numeric computing environment as well as a multi-paradigm programming language. It covers several areas of technical computing, such as symbolic mathematics, numerical analysis, data processing, visualization, and others. A toolbox, MapleSim, adds functionality for multidomain physical modeling and code generation.

Maple's capacity for symbolic computing include those of a general-purpose computer algebra system. For instance, it can manipulate mathematical expressions and find symbolic solutions to
certain problems, such as those arising from ordinary and partial differential equations.

Maple is developed commercially by the Canadian software company Maplesoft. The name 'Maple' is a reference to the software's Canadian heritage.

Overview

Core functionality
Users can enter mathematics in traditional mathematical notation.  Custom user interfaces can also be created. There is support for numeric computations, to arbitrary precision, as well as symbolic computation and visualization.  Examples of symbolic computations are given below.

Maple incorporates a dynamically typed imperative-style programming language (resembling Pascal), which permits variables of lexical scope. There are also interfaces to other languages (C, C#, Fortran, Java, MATLAB, and Visual Basic), as well as to Microsoft Excel.

Maple supports MathML 2.0, which is a W3C format for representing and interpreting mathematical expressions, including their display in web pages. There is also functionality for converting expressions from traditional mathematical notation to markup suitable for the typesetting system LaTeX.

Architecture
Maple is based on a small kernel, written in C, which provides the Maple language. Most functionality is provided by libraries, which come from a variety of sources. Most of the libraries are written in the Maple language; these have viewable source code.  Many numerical computations are performed by the NAG Numerical Libraries, ATLAS libraries, or GMP libraries.

Different functionality in Maple requires numerical data in different formats. Symbolic expressions are stored in memory as directed acyclic graphs. The standard interface and calculator interface are written in Java.

History
The first concept of Maple arose from a meeting in late 1980 at the University of Waterloo. Researchers at the university wished to purchase a computer powerful enough to run the Lisp-based computer algebra system Macsyma. Instead, they opted to develop their own computer algebra system, named Maple, that would run on lower cost computers. Aiming for portability, they began writing Maple in programming languages from the BCPL family (initially using a subset of B and C, and later on only C). A first limited version appeared after three weeks, and fuller versions entered mainstream use beginning in 1982. By the end of 1983, over 50 universities had copies of Maple installed on their machines.

In 1984, the research group arranged with Watcom Products Inc to license and distribute the first commercially available version, Maple 3.3. In 1988 Waterloo Maple Inc. (Maplesoft) was founded. The company’s original goal was to manage the distribution of the software, but eventually it grew to have its own R&D department, where most of Maple's development takes place today (the remainder being done at various university laboratories).

In 1989, the first graphical user interface for Maple was developed and included with version 4.3 for the Macintosh. X11 and Windows versions of the new interface followed in 1990 with Maple V. In 1992, Maple V Release 2 introduced the Maple "worksheet" that combined text, graphics, and input and typeset output. In 1994 a special issue of a newsletter created by Maple developers called MapleTech was published.

In 1999, with the release of Maple 6, Maple included some of the NAG Numerical Libraries.  In 2003, the current "standard" interface was introduced with Maple 9. This interface is primarily written in Java (although portions, such as the rules for typesetting mathematical formulae, are written in the Maple language). The Java interface was criticized for being slow; improvements have been made in later versions, although the Maple 11 documentation recommends the previous ("classic") interface for users with less than 500 MB of physical memory.

Between 1995 and 2005 Maple lost significant market share to competitors due to a weaker user interface. With Maple 10 in 2005, Maple introduced a new "document mode" interface, which has since been further developed across several releases.

In September 2009 Maple and Maplesoft were acquired by the Japanese software retailer Cybernet Systems.

Version history

    Maple 1.0: January, 1982
    Maple 1.1: January, 1982
    Maple 2.0: May, 1982
    Maple 2.1: June, 1982
    Maple 2.15: August, 1982
    Maple 2.2: December, 1982
    Maple 3.0: May, 1983
    Maple 3.1: October, 1983
    Maple 3.2: April, 1984
    Maple 3.3: March, 1985 (first public available version)
    Maple 4.0: April, 1986
    Maple 4.1: May, 1987
    Maple 4.2: December, 1987
    Maple 4.3: March, 1989
    Maple V: August, 1990
    Maple V R2: November 1992
    Maple V R3: March 15, 1994
    Maple V R4: January, 1996
    Maple V R5: November 1, 1997
    Maple 6: December 6, 1999
    Maple 7: July 1, 2001
    Maple 8: April 16, 2002
    Maple 9: June 30, 2003
    Maple 9.5: April 15, 2004
    Maple 10: May 10, 2005
    Maple 11: February 21, 2007
    Maple 11.01: July, 2007
    Maple 11.02: November, 2007
    Maple 12: May, 2008
    Maple 12.01: October, 2008
    Maple 12.02: December, 2008
    Maple 13: April 28, 2009
    Maple 13.01: July, 2009
    Maple 13.02: October, 2009
    Maple 14: April 29, 2010
    Maple 14.01: October 28, 2010
    Maple 15: April 13, 2011
    Maple 15.01: June 21, 2011
    Maple 16: March 28, 2012
    Maple 16.01: May 16, 2012
    Maple 17: March 13, 2013
    Maple 17.01: July, 2013
    Maple 18: Mar 5, 2014
    Maple 18.01: May, 2014
    Maple 18.01a: July, 2014
    Maple 18.02: Nov, 2014
    Maple 2015.0: Mar 4, 2015
    Maple 2015.1: Nov, 2015
    Maple 2016.0: March 2, 2016
    Maple 2016.1: April 20, 2016
    Maple 2016.1a: April 27, 2016
    Maple 2017.0: May 25, 2017
    Maple 2017.1: June 28, 2017
    Maple 2017.2: August 2, 2017
    Maple 2017.3: October 3, 2017
    Maple 2018.0: March 21, 2018
    Maple 2019.0: March 14, 2019
    Maple 2020.0: March 12, 2020

Features
Features of Maple include:
 Support for symbolic and numeric computation with arbitrary precision
 Elementary and special mathematical function libraries
 Complex numbers and interval arithmetic
 Arithmetic, greatest common divisors and factorization for multivariate polynomials over the rationals, finite fields, algebraic number fields, and algebraic function fields
 Limits, series and asymptotic expansions
 Gröbner basis
 Differential Algebra
 Matrix manipulation tools including support for sparse arrays
 Mathematical function graphing and animation tools
 Solvers for systems of equations, diophantine equations, ODEs, PDEs, DAEs, DDEs and recurrence relations 
 Numeric and symbolic tools for discrete and continuous calculus including definite and indefinite integration, definite and indefinite summation, automatic differentiation and continuous and discrete integral transforms
 Constrained and unconstrained local and global optimization
 Statistics including model fitting, hypothesis testing, and probability distributions
 Tools for data manipulation, visualization and analysis
 Tools for probability and combinatoric problems
 Support for time-series and unit based data
 Connection to online collection of financial and economic data
 Tools for financial calculations including bonds, annuities, derivatives, options etc.
 Calculations and simulations on random processes
 Tools for text mining including regular expressions
 Tools for signal processing and linear and non-linear control systems
 Discrete math tools including number theory
 Tools for visualizing and analysing directed and undirected graphs
 Group theory including permutation and finitely presented groups
 Symbolic tensor functions
 Import and export filters for data, image, sound, CAD, and document formats
 Technical word processing including formula editing 
 Programming language supporting procedural, functional and object-oriented constructs
 Tools for adding user interfaces to calculations and applications
 Tools for connecting to SQL, Java, .NET, C++, Fortran and http
 Tools for generating code for C, C#, Fortran, Java, JavaScript, Julia, Matlab, Perl, Python, R, and Visual Basic
 Tools for parallel programming

Examples of Maple code
The following code, which computes the factorial of a nonnegative integer, is an example of an imperative programming construct within Maple:

myfac := proc(n::nonnegint)
   local out, i;
   out := 1;
   for i from 2 to n do
       out := out * i
   end do;
   out
end proc;
Simple functions can also be defined using the "maps to" arrow notation:
 myfac := n -> product(i, i = 1..n);

Integration
Find
.
 int(cos(x/a), x);
Output:

Determinant
Compute the determinant of a matrix.
 M := Matrix([[1,2,3], [a,b,c], [x,y,z]]);  # example Matrix
 
 LinearAlgebra:-Determinant(M);

Series expansion
series(tanh(x), x = 0, 15)

Solve equations numerically
The following code numerically calculates the roots of a high-order polynomial:
 f := x^53-88*x^5-3*x-5 = 0

 fsolve(f)

 -1.097486315, -.5226535640, 1.099074017

The same command can also solve systems of equations:
 f := (cos(x+y))^2 + exp(x)*y+cot(x-y)+cosh(z+x) = 0:

 g := x^5 - 8*y = 2:

 h := x+3*y-77*z=55;
                    
 fsolve( {f,g,h} );

 {x = -2.080507182, y = -5.122547821, z = -0.9408850733}

Plotting of function of single variable
Plot  with  ranging from -10 to 10:
 plot(x*sin(x), x = -10..10);

Plotting of function of two variables
plot3d(x^2+y^2, x = -1..1, y = -1..1);

Animation of functions
 Animation of function of two variables

plots:-animate(subs(k = 0.5, f), x=-30..30, t=-10..10, numpoints=200, frames=50, color=red, thickness=3);

 Animation of functions of three variables
plots:-animate3d(cos(t*x)*sin(3*t*y), x=-Pi..Pi, y=-Pi..Pi, t=1..2);

 Fly-through animation of 3-D plots.
 M := Matrix([[400,400,200], [100,100,-400], [1,1,1]], datatype=float[8]):
 plot3d(1, x=0..2*Pi, y=0..Pi, axes=none, coords=spherical, viewpoint=[path=M]);

Laplace transform
 Laplace transform
f := (1+A*t+B*t^2)*exp(c*t);

 inttrans:-laplace(f, t, s);

 inverse Laplace transform
inttrans:-invlaplace(1/(s-a), s, x);

Fourier transform
 Fourier transform
 inttrans:-fourier(sin(x), x, w)

Integral equations
Find functions  that satisfy the integral equation
.
eqn:= f(x)-3*Int((x*y+x^2*y^2)*f(y), y=-1..1) = h(x):
intsolve(eqn,f(x));

Use of the Maple engine
The Maple engine is used within several other products from Maplesoft:
 Moebius, DigitalEd’s online testing suite, uses Maple to algorithmically generate questions and grade student responses.
 MapleNet allows users to create JSP pages and Java Applets. MapleNet 12 and above also allow users to upload and work with Maple worksheets containing interactive components.
 MapleSim, an engineering simulation tool.
 Maple Quantum Chemistry Package from RDMChem computes and visualizes the electronic energies and properties of molecules.

Listed below are third-party commercial products that no longer use the Maple engine:
 Versions of Mathcad released between 1994 and 2006 included a Maple-derived algebra engine (MKM, aka Mathsoft Kernel Maple), though subsequent versions use MuPAD.
 Symbolic Math Toolbox in MATLAB contained a portion of the Maple 10 engine, but now uses MuPAD (starting with MATLAB R2007b+ release).
 Older versions of the mathematical editor Scientific Workplace included Maple as a computational engine, though current versions include MuPAD.

See also

 Comparison of computer algebra systems
 Comparison of numerical-analysis software
 Comparison of programming languages
 Comparison of statistical packages
 List of computer algebra systems
 List of computer simulation software
 List of graphing software
 List of numerical-analysis software
 Mathematical software
 SageMath (an open source algebra program)

References

External links

 Maplesoft, division of Waterloo Maple, Inc. – official website

C (programming language) software
Notebook interface
Computer algebra system software for Linux
Computer algebra system software for macOS
Computer algebra system software for Windows
Computer algebra systems
Cross-platform software
Data mining and machine learning software
Data visualization software
Data-centric programming languages
Econometrics software
Functional languages
Interactive geometry software
IRIX software
Linear algebra
Maplesoft
Mathematical optimization software
Mathematical software
Numerical analysis software for Linux
Numerical analysis software for macOS
Numerical analysis software for Windows
Numerical programming languages
Numerical software
Parallel computing
Physics software
Plotting software
Products introduced in 1982
Proprietary commercial software for Linux
Proprietary cross-platform software
Regression and curve fitting software
Simulation programming languages
Software modeling language
Statistical programming languages
Theorem proving software systems
Time series software